= Golf USA =

American golf store franchise

Golf USA is a golf store franchise headquartered in Shawnee, Oklahoma. Golf USA coordinates more than 60 retail golf outlets worldwide through company owned stores, franchises and affiliates. The stores are spread throughout the United States, as well as 15 other different countries.

== History ==
Founded in Oklahoma in 1986, Golf USA began franchising operations in 1989 with the goal of bringing quality golf equipment, club repair, and outstanding service to golfers throughout the world. Currently Golf USA operates over 60 locations in 12 countries, including over 30 locations throughout the United States.

With a strong emphasis on customer service and great brands, Golf USA franchise stores have had a long history of success in many markets across the United States. Golf USA stores range from 2,500 to 7,500 square feet in size and carry a large selection of name brand equipment. Most stores offer club repair, along with custom club and ball fitting services to enhance a player's overall performance.

Golf USA locations are individually owned and operated, in most cases by an owner who is local to that community. This local bond has been a key component in the success that many stores have experienced. A typical Golf USA owner is not only involved with their store, but their entire community. and again in 2008.

In 2013, Golf USA filed for Chapter 11 bankruptcy protection.
